The Banu Amir was a large and ancient Arab tribe originating from central Arabia, that dominated Najd for centuries after the rise of Islam. The tribe is an Arab Adnanite tribe and its lineage is traced back to Adnan and Ishmael son of Abraham through Hawazin, and its original homeland was the border area between Nejd and Hejaz in Khurmah and Ranyah. Although the Banu Amir were engaged in a long war with the Quraysh before the appearance of Islam—manifesting in particular as the Fijar War—the tribe was characterized by giving late allegiance to Muhammad and his immediate successors. The tribe produced several well-known Arabic poets, the most famous of whom was Labid ibn Rabi'ah, an author of one of the Seven Hanged Poems. Other poets included Amir ibn al-Tufayl, an important tribal chief; al-Ra'i al-Numayri, an opponent of Jarir; and the female poet Layla al-Akhyaliyyah. The protagonists of the romantic saga of Layla wal Majnun, Qays and Layla, also belonged to Banu Amir.

Branches 

The main tribes that constituted this confederation were as follows:
 Banu Kilab – The descendants of Kilab ibn Rab'iah ibn 'Amir ibn Sa'sa' ibn Mu'awiyah ibn Bakr ibn Hawazin. A Bedouin tribe that lived in western Nejd and who led the Banu 'Amir confederation prior to Islam. Like other Amiri tribes, they were allied with the eastern Arabian Qarmatian movement, then came to dominate central Arabia after the Qartmatian's demise. Later the tribe migrated northwards to Syria and briefly established the Mirdasid dynasty there. The tribe seems to have settled and dispersed among the native population there during the Mameluke period.
 Banu Numayr – a mostly Bedouin tribe that lived on the western borders of al-Yamamah and were allied with the Umayyad dynasty. They left for the banks of the Euphrates river in Iraq after a 9th-century Abbasid military campaign against them in al-Yamama.
 Banu Ka'b – this section was the largest of the Bani 'Amir, and was divided into four tribes: Banu Uqayl, Banu Ja'dah, Banu Qushayr, and Al Harish. All were native to al-Yamamah, particularly the southern regions of that district, and included both bedouin pastoralists and settled agriculturists. Of the four, Banu Uqayl was by far the largest and most powerful. Having left for northern Iraq in the late Abbasid era, the bedouins of Banu Uqayl established the Uqaylid dynasty in Mosul (5th Islamic century). Later, sections of the tribe returned to Arabia, settling in the Province of Bahrain where they gave rise to the Usfurid and Jabrid dynasties. Several tribal groups in Iraq originated from Uqayl, including Khafajah, Ubadah and al-Muntafiq. Other sections of Kaab left al-Yamamah and Nejd at a later date and settled along both sides of the Persian Gulf. They are now known as Bani Kaab and mostly live in the Ahwaz region of Iran and UAE and Iraq.
 Banu Hilal – probably the most well-known Amirid tribe, they were enlisted by the Fatimid rulers of Egypt in the 11th century, and left for Upper Egypt before invading North Africa in what later became a celebrated saga in the Arab World. In 1535, the Banu Amir ruler Ibn Radwan collaborated with Spain in an attack on the city of Tlemcen. The project was to replace the ruler of Tlemcen Sultan Muhammad by Ibn Radwan's younger brother Abdulla. They were opposed by the Banu Rashid tribes under Sultan Muhammad, and the Spanish forces were besieged at the Tibda fortress and exterminated, except for 70 prisoners.

In addition to the Uqaylid tribes of Iraq, the modern tribes of Subay', the Suhool in Nejd, and some sections of Bani Khalid trace their lineage to Banu 'Amir.

Military campaigns during Muhammad's era 

The tribe was involved in military conflict with Muhammad. Four months after the Uhud battle, a delegation of Banu Amir came to Muhammad and presented him with a gift. Abu Bara stayed in Medina. Muhammad declined to accept that gift because it was from a polytheist and asked Abu Bara to embrace Islam. He requested Muhammad to send some Muslims to the people of Najd to call them to Islam. At first, Muhammad was quite apprehensive of this, as he feared that some harm might befall on these Muslim missionaries. On Muhammad's hesitation, Abu Bara guaranteed the safety of the emissaries of Muhammad.

The Muslim scholar Tabari describes the event as follows:

Ibn Ishaq's biography claims that forty men were sent to them; but Sahih al-Bukhari states that there were seventy—Al-Mundhir bin 'Amr, one of Banu Sa'ida, nicknamed 'Freed to die'—commanded that group, who were the best and most learned in the Qur'an and jurisprudence.

Muhammad also ordered the Expedition of Shuja ibn Wahb al-Asadi in June 629 with the purpose of raiding the Banu Amir tribe to plunder camels.

See also
Usfurids
Jarwanid dynasty
Mirdasid dynasty
Uqaylid dynasty
List of expeditions of Muhammad

References

Tribes of Arabia
Tribes of Saudi Arabia